Dasylirion acrotrichum, the great desert spoon and green sotol (also, spoon yucca, though not a true Yucca), is a plant native to the Chihuahuan Desert and other xeric habitats in northern and central Mexico.

Description

Cultivation
The drought-tolerant and dramatic plant is cultivated by nurseries for use in personal gardens and larger xeriscape landscape projects in the Southwestern United States and California. Dasylirion acrotrichum is hardy to

References

acrotrichum
Flora of Central Mexico
Flora of Northeastern Mexico
Flora of San Luis Potosí
Flora of Zacatecas
Flora of Aguascalientes
Flora of Guanajuato
Flora of Hidalgo (state)
Flora of Jalisco
Flora of Nayarit
Flora of Querétaro
Flora of Veracruz
Garden plants of North America
Drought-tolerant plants
Taxa named by Joseph Gerhard Zuccarini